Wettinia longipetala is a species of tree in the family Arecaceae. It is found only in Peru, and is considered a vulnerable species by the IUCN.

References

longipetala
Endemic flora of Peru
Vulnerable flora of South America
Taxonomy articles created by Polbot
Trees of Peru